Hawwa is an Arabic name for Eve.

Hawwa may also refer to:

Hawwa (album), a studio album by Haifa Wehbe
Al-Hawwa', a village in Hadhramaut Governorate, Yemen

People with the surname
Saʽid Ḥawwa (1935–1989), high-ranking member and author in the Muslim Brotherhood of Syria
Yahya Hawwa (born 1976), Syrian singer

See also
Hawa (disambiguation)
 Hawwah (Gain EP)